Brandon Lee Ríos (born April 29, 1986) is an American professional boxer. He held the WBA lightweight title in 2011 and has challenged once for the WBO welterweight title in 2015. Nicknamed "Bam Bam", Ríos was known for his aggressive pressure fighting style, formidable punching power, and exceptionally durable chin during his prime.

Amateur career
Ríos compiled a stellar amateur record of 230–35. In 2004 he became the U.S. National Amateur Featherweight champion, and was also a United States Olympic alternate at 125 lbs. "When I met Roberto in the Olympic trials in Mississippi, that's when Roberto came and worked my corner, which it was a bad mistake," Rios said as García laughed. "I should have never done that because my dad was my amateur coach through my whole career. You get used to one person and then you come with another guy and he doesn't really know you? To me, it kind of messed me up. But then again, I'm glad we met because we exchanged information and he brought me down here."

Professional career

He is signed to Bob Arum's company Top Rank. On October 17, 2009, Ríos got a TKO victory in the 7th round over Manuel Pérez.

He next fought in a WBA title eliminator against the undefeated contender Anthony Peterson, on a HBO Boxing After Dark card. Rios dropped Peterson to the canvas with a left hand at the end of the fifth round. In the sixth round, a desperate Peterson landed several low blows on Ríos, losing two points in the process. In the seventh round, Peterson landed low blows once again, prompting the referee to stop the bout and award Ríos a disqualification victory. Brandon was leading on all three scorecards before the stoppage. His next fight was the first HBO PPV fight on the undercard of Margarito vs. Pacquiao. Bob Arum stated that if Rios beat Omri Lowther at Cowboys Stadium, Brandon would get a shot to fight against WBC Lightweight Champion Humberto Soto next. Rios won by TKO in the fifth round.

WBA Lightweight Championship
On February 26, 2011, Rios defeated WBA World Lightweight Champion, Venezuelan Miguel Acosta via a 10th-round TKO, becoming the new WBA regular Lightweight champion.

Ríos vs. Antillon

Brandon's first title defense saw him face Urbano Antillón, in a bout that was previously expected to take place once before in May 2010. Rios won the fight by TKO in the third round.

Light Welterweight

Ríos vs. Alvarado I & II
Rios faced Mike Alvarado at the Home Depot Center in Carson, California on October 13, 2012. Rios was behind on the scorecards until the 6th round where in he hurt Alvarado with a crushing right. Rios was able to stop Alvarado in the 7th as referee Pat Russell stopped the bout at 1:57 of the round. The fight was voted the 2012 Fight of the Year by the Sports Illustrated.

A much anticipated rematch was held on March 30, 2013, at the Mandalay Bay in Las Vegas, Nevada. Like the first fight, both came in with a lot of fireworks as they continued to go toe to toe, until Alvarado changed strategy and became a lot more evasive and hard to hit with fancy footwork. Alvarado defeated Rios by unanimous decision with scores of 115–113, 115–113 and 114–113. Top Rank promoter Bob Arum dismissed another rematch and suggested to let the two boxers face other fighters first.

Welterweight

Rios vs. Pacquiao

Rios and Pacquiao battled for the vacant WBO International Welterweight title on November 23, 2013, at Cotai Arena in Macau. Rios was guaranteed a purse of $3 million for this fight which is the highest of his boxing career. On August 5, Ríos and Pacquiao hit the road on a U.S. tour promoting the fight. Pacquiao won the 12-round match and the WBO International Welterweight title very easily.

Ríos vs. Alvarado III
Following a disqualification win over Argentine Diego Chaves, a third fight was announced against old rival, Mike Alvarado. On January 24, 2015, in Alvarado's home town of Denver, Colorado, Rios punished Alvarado for 3 rounds before the referee stopped the fight prior to the start of the fourth.

Ríos vs. Bradley
On November 7, 2015, Rios battled Timothy Bradley for the WBO Welterweight title at the Thomas & Mack Center in Las Vegas, Nevada. He was unsuccessful in doing so, losing every round of the fight in the process before referee Tony Weeks called an end to the bout at 2:48 of the ninth round, marking the first time Ríos had ever been stopped in his professional career.

During the emotional post-fight interview, Rios announced his retirement, stating that although he loved the sport, his body was no longer acting the same and that both weight fluctuations and layoffs were affecting his performances. He has since gone on record to say that he would also like to spend more time with his family and close friends now as well.

Comeback
Rios made a comeback to the ring against Aaron Herrera on June 11, 2017, with new trainer Ricky Funez, after splitting with longtime trainer Robert García. Rios won by KO in the 7th round.

Rios vs Garcia 
In his next fight, Rios fought former world titlist Danny Garcia who was ranked #1 by the WBA and #2 by the WBC at welterweight. Garcia won the fight via TKO in the ninth round.

Rios vs Alvarez 
In his next bout, Rios fought Ramon Alvarez the brother of pound-for-pound great Canelo Alvarez. In an action-packed fight, Rios startet off sloppy, but managed to turn the fight around and punish Alvarez and finish him in the ninth round.

Rios vs Soto 
Rios' next fight came against Humerto Soto. In another action-packed fight, Rios pressed forward and was looking to exchange. Soto, however, was the craftier and more efficient of the two throughout the fight, which earned him a wide unanimous decision win on all three scorecards, 119-111, 118-112 and 118-112.

Personal life
Brandon married Victoria López in August 2010 and has three children and two from a previous relationship. Ríos gave the names Laila, Mia and Ava to his three daughters, after boxers Mia St. John and Laila Ali. His two sons are named Brandon Jr. and Marcus Antonio respectively, the latter of which is after Mexican World Champion Marco Antonio Barrera.

Ríos's dad is Mexican. Ríos's mom is from Texas, and she is a Native American of the Alabama tribe. Ríos said that the eagle tattoo on his chest is to represent both his Mexican and Native American ancestry.

Victor Ortiz feud
As amateur boxers both Ríos and Victor Ortíz fought out of the same boxing gym in Garden City, Kansas, at the Garden City Boxing Club where they were both trained by Manuel Ríos. For a short time Brandon's father trained Ortíz when they both still lived in Kansas. Ortíz would later move to Oxnard to train under Robert García, Ríos also left Kansas after being invited by García to train in Oxnard. In 2009 after an incident involving Brandon, Victor and Victor's younger brother Temo, their relationship became strained. A fight between Ríos and Ortíz has been proposed at a catch weight of 138 lbs or even at 140 lbs, with Ríos stating on numerous occasions that he's gotten the better of Ortíz many times during sparring when they were growing up.

Freddie Roach incident
In the much anticipated lead up to the Margarito vs. Pacquiao fight at Cowboys Stadium, Ríos made headlines along with Antonio Margarito and Robert García when Elie Seckbach interviewed the three of them and showed the group mocking Manny Pacquiao's trainer Freddie Roach, who has Parkinson's disease. Elie Seckbach made a video response defending Rios and Margarito, and stated that the media misunderstood their gestures. Seckbach stated that they were actually making fun of Freddie Roach's comments where he (Roach) stated that Margarito was going to get knocked out. García explained that Ríos was "joking around", and that Brandon was also unaware that Roach suffers from Parkinson's disease. In the video, Ríos himself explains that their gestures were a response to Roach's trash talking.

Professional boxing record

References

External links

Brandon Rios - Profile, News Archive & Current Rankings at Box.Live

American people who self-identify as being of Native American descent
American boxers of Mexican descent
World lightweight boxing champions
World Boxing Association champions
Sportspeople from Oxnard, California
Boxers from Texas
Sportspeople from Lubbock, Texas
Doping cases in boxing
1986 births
Living people
Winners of the United States Championship for amateur boxers
American male boxers
Featherweight boxers
Sportspeople from Ventura County, California